Conus ventricosus mediterraneus is a subspecies of sea snail, a marine gastropod mollusk in the family Conidae, the cone snails and their allies.

Like all species within the genus Conus, these snails are predatory and venomous. They are capable of "stinging" humans, therefore live ones should be handled carefully or not at all.

Description
The size of an adult shell varies between 13 mm and 63 mm. The color of the shell is yellowish brown, pink-brown or olivaceous ; sometimes
chocolate-brown, very closely nebulously spotted and reticulated ; and sometimes interrupted-lined with chestnut, with a narrow, light band below the middle. The elevated spire is rudely gradate and maculated. The interior of the shell is light chocolate, with a light band.

Distribution
This subspecies occurs in the Mediterranean Sea, but not in the Eastern Atlantic Ocean off Senegal.

Synonyms

 Conus adriaticus Nardo, 1847
 Conus alticonica Pallary, 1904
 Conus amazonicus Nardo, 1847
 Conus ammiralis var. americanus Gmelin, 1791
 Conus caffer Bucquoy, Dautzenberg & Dollfus, 1882
 Conus caillaudi Jay, 1846
 Conus chersoideus Nardo, 1847
 Conus cinctus Bosc, 1801
 Conus cinereus Delle Chiaje & Poli, 1826 
 Conus clodianus Nardo, 1847
 Conus cretheus Nardo, 1847
 Conus elpus De Gregorio, 1885
 Conus epaphus Nardo, 1847
 Conus erosus Renier, 1804
 Conus franciscanus Hwass in Bruguière, 1792
 Conus galloprovincialis Locard, 1886
 Conus galloprovincialis var. lineolata Locard & Caziot, 1900
 Conus galloprovincialis var. minor Locard & Caziot, 1900
 Conus glaucescens G. B. Sowerby II, 1834
 Conus grossii Maravigna, 1853
 Conus guestieri Lorois, 1860
 Conus hanleyi G. B. Sowerby II, 1857 Conus hanley   Conus hanley
 Conus herillus Nardo, 1847
 Conus humilis von Salis Marschlins, 1793
 Conus ignobilis Olivi, 1792
 Conus ignobilis var. rufa Scacchi, 1836
 Conus inaequalis Reeve, 1849
 Conus intermedius Lamarck, 1810
 Conus istriensis Nardo, 1847
 Conus jamaicensis Hwass in Bruguière, 1792
 Conus jaspis von Salis Marschlins, 1793
 Conus madurensis Hwass in Bruguière, 1792
 Conus mediterraneus f. gaudiosus Nicolay, 1978
 Conus mediterraneus var. acuta Requien, 1848
 Conus mediterraneus var. alalmus DeGregorio, 1885
 Conus mediterraneus var. alba Coen, 1933
 Conus mediterraneus var. albina Bucquoy, Dautzenberg & Dollfus, 1882
 Conus mediterraneus var. alticonica Pallary, 1904
 Conus mediterraneus var. amigus DeGregorio, 1885
 Conus mediterraneus var. arenaria Monterosato, 1917
 Conus mediterraneus var. ater Philippi, 1836
 Conus mediterraneus var. caerulescens Bucquoy, Dautzenberg & Dollfus, 1883
 Conus mediterraneus var. carinata Bucquoy, Dautzenberg & Dollfus, 1884
 Conus mediterraneus var. castanea Coen, 1933
 Conus mediterraneus var. debilis Monterosato, 1917
 Conus mediterraneus var. elongata Bucquoy, Dautzenberg & Dollfus, 1885
 Conus mediterraneus var. emisus DeGregorio, 1885
 Conus mediterraneus var. fasciata Requien, 1848
 Conus mediterraneus var. flammulata Bucquoy, Dautzenberg & Dollfus, 1886
 Conus mediterraneus var. flavescens Coen, 1933
 Conus mediterraneus var. fusca Bucquoy, Dautzenberg & Dollfus, 1887
 Conus mediterraneus var. interrupta Coen, 1933 
 Conus mediterraneus var. lutea Bucquoy, Dautzenberg & Dollfus, 1888
 Conus mediterraneus var. major Bucquoy, Dautzenberg & Dollfus, 1889 
 Conus mediterraneus var. marmoratus Philippi, 1836
  Conus mediterraneus var. minor Monterosato, 1878 
 Conus mediterraneus var. oblonga Bucquoy, Dautzenberg & Dollfus, 1890
 Conus mediterraneus var. obtusa Requien, 1848
 Conus mediterraneus var. pallida Bucquoy, Dautzenberg & Dollfus, 1891 
 Conus mediterraneus var. persistens Kobelt, 1906
 Conus mediterraneus var. pretunculus Monterosato, 1917
 Conus mediterraneus var. rubens Bucquoy, Dautzenberg & Dollfus, 1892 
 Conus mediterraneus var. rufatra DeGregorio, 1885
 Conus mediterraneus var. scalare Dautzenberg, 1911
 Conus mediterraneus var. scalaris Pallary, 1912
 Conus mediterraneus var. subconcolor Requien, 1848 
 Conus mediterraneus var. subviridis DeGregorio, 1885 
 Conus mediterraneus var. vayssierei Kobelt, 1906
 Conus olivaceus von Salis Marschlins, 1793
 Conus olivaceus Kiener, 1845 
 Conus pallans Nardo, 1847 
 Conus phegeus Nardo, 1847 
 Conus postdiluvianus Risso, 1826
 Conus rusticus Poli, 1826 
 Conus siculus DelleChiaje, 1828
 Conus stercutius Nardo, 1847
 Conus submediterraneus Locard, 1886
 Conus thuscus Nardo, 1847
 Conus trunculus Monterosato, 1899 
 Conus vayssierei var. ossea Monterosato, 1917 
 Conus ventricosus Gmelin, 1791 
 Conus ventricosus var. elpus DeGregorio, 1885
 Conus ventricosus var. empismus DeGregorio, 1885 
 Lautoconus noeformis Monterosato, 1923

References

 Filmer R.M. (2001). A Catalogue of Nomenclature and Taxonomy in the Living Conidae 1758–1998. Backhuys Publishers, Leiden. 388pp.
 Tucker J.K. (2009). Recent cone species database. September 4, 2009 Edition.

External links
 The Conus Biodiversity website
 

mediterraneus